is a Japanese swimmer. He won a bronze medal in the men's 4 × 100 metre medley relay at the 2008 Summer Olympics.

External links
 Athlete bio at 2008 Olympics site

1983 births
Living people
Japanese male backstroke swimmers
Olympic swimmers of Japan
Swimmers at the 2008 Summer Olympics
Olympic bronze medalists for Japan
People from Kagoshima
Olympic bronze medalists in swimming
Asian Games medalists in swimming
Swimmers at the 2006 Asian Games
Medalists at the 2008 Summer Olympics
Asian Games gold medalists for Japan
Medalists at the 2006 Asian Games
Universiade medalists in swimming
Universiade bronze medalists for Japan
Medalists at the 2005 Summer Universiade
20th-century Japanese people
21st-century Japanese people